The Revue Salamandre (named La Salamandre until 2020) is a Swiss French-language magazine about nature.

History and profile
La Salamandre was established in 1983 by an 11-year-old boy, Julien Perrot. La Salamandre is a non-profit-making company and its magazines do not contain any advertising. The magazine had 6,000 subscribers in 1997 and 30,000 in 2013, mainly in Switzerland and France.

A nature magazine for children (6-10 years) is also published, in French (La Petite Salamandre). It had 18,000 subscribers in 2013. A German version was also created (Der Kleine Salamander) for German-speaking Switzerland and Germany.

La Salamandre holds a yearly nature festival, the "Festival de la Salamandre". It celebrated its tenth anniversary in 2012. In 2011, La Salamandre also founded annual nature event in Switzerland, the "Fête de la nature".

The magazine regularly has partnerships with the scientific programmes of the Radio suisse romande ("Impatience", "CQFD" and "Prise de terre") and France Inter ("La tête au carré").

See also
 List of magazines in Switzerland
 List of wildlife magazines

References

External links 
 

1983 establishments in Switzerland
Bi-monthly magazines published in Switzerland
French-language magazines
French-language mass media in Switzerland
Magazines established in 1983
Mass media in Neuchâtel
Nature magazines
Magazines published in Switzerland